The Southern Song dynasty refers to an era of the Song dynasty after Kaifeng was captured by the Jurchen-led Jin dynasty in 1127. The government of the Song was forced to establish a new capital city at Lin'an (present day Hangzhou) which wasn't near any sources of copper so the quality of the cash coins produced under the Southern Song significantly deteriorated compared to the cast copper-alloy cash coins of the Northern Song dynasty. The Southern Song government preferred to invest in their defenses (as its incapable military easily fell to the Jin dynasty) while trying to remain passive towards the Jin dynasty establishing a long peace until the Mongols eventually annexed the Jin before marching down to the Song establishing the Yuan dynasty.

Coins from the Song dynasty have appeared in variants written in either standard (top-bottom-right-left) or clockwise (top-right-bottom-left).

The Southern Song dynasty saw the emergence of paper money, while coins were increasingly becoming a rarity. Iron cash coins also started to be used in greater numbers, at first due to the lack of copper, but later even as more copper was found the production of iron cash coins remained cheaper and an abundance of iron made it more attractive for the government to produce, while several problems such as the fact that iron is harder to inscribe, and that iron corrodes faster ensured the continued production of copper cash coins. Despite the chronic shortages of copper the Southern Song used special coins as a form of psychological warfare against Jin army defectors, and copper coins (and later silver sycees) would remain the standard of administration even for the newly introduced paper money.

Background 

The Northern Song dynasty saw the reunification of most parts of China proper and also of its currency. The Northern Song dynasty saw the widespread usage of "matched cash coins" which used different types of Chinese calligraphy for the same inscriptions and the reintroduction of cash coins of different denominations. Government corruption would lead to the Northern Song government producing large quantities of iron cash coins by the end of the reign of Emperor Zhezong.

By the time of the Chongning Zhongbao (崇寧重寶) cash coins of the Emperor Huizong, 10 wén cash coins had become the norm as the government used it as a method to confiscate the wealth of the people to enrich its treasury. In a story dating to the Northern Song dynasty time period, a man purchasing a bowl of soup is used to illustrate the hardship caused by the lack of 1 wén cash coins, which are known as Xiaoping cash coins (小平錢). 

These 10 wén cash coins were so overvalued by the government that they were eventually devalued by the market until they were only worth the equivalent of 3 cash coins.

History 

The Southern Song would suffer from what had been called "currency famines" or Qian Huang, during the mid-13th century, this was because the production of bronze coinage had fallen to merely 2 to 3% of what it had been under the Northern Song, meanwhile the relative value of silver compared to bronze had steadily increased leading to the Song government adopting silver as the new standard as the value of silver would remain pretty much standard at the entire duration of the Southern Song while the value of bronze would fluctuate enormously.

The Song dynasty had several "monetary regions" which all had their own separate combination of bronze, and/or iron coins, paper money, and silver sycees in circulation. These separate regional currency standards created distinct regional characters that would often hinder interregional trade between them. The Song government's general inability to create enough bronze wén coins to circulate helped strengthen this monetary diversity that would impede trade, even though the Northern Song had enough bronze for this demand and to even create large coins called "biscuit coins", the southern regions lacked these resources after they had lost the North to the Jin.

Despite the large variety in different media of exchange, Southern Song dynasty documents always measure prices in bronze coins (guàn , and wén ), which includes the value of silver bullion itself. After Wang Anshi reformed the fiscal administration of the Southern Song between 1069 and 1085, silver became a vital element in administrative book-keeping, especially in certain regions rich in silver such as modern-day Sichuan.

In the year 1173 during the reign of Emperor Xiaozong the period title was proclaimed to be Chunxi with the "Chun" written as "纯". Only six days later after this proclamation, the "Chun" was officially changed to be written in Hanzi as "淳". The Tongan mint in the Anhui region produced a very small quantity of Chunxi Yuanbao (纯熙元寶) iron cash coins with the chun written as "纯".  These diminutive iron coins today are considered to be very rare. Furthermore, during the beginning of the Chunxi period, bronze cash coins produced from this era and continuing to the very end of the Southern Song dynasty, tended to have their inscriptions (or legends) written in a form of Chinese calligraphy that is today known as the "Song style script" or "regular script". For this reason, there are in fact fewer number of varieties of bronze Song dynasty cash coins from this period onwards compared to those from earlier periods.

Until 1179 the Northern Song era's policies of casting coins in varying typefaces continued but after this year most coins tended to only have Regular script inscriptions. Beginning in 1180 coins cast by the Southern Song government started to cast the reign year on the reverses of coins as well as mint marks in order to stop forgeries from circulated, this was because the technology to cast inscriptions on both sides of the coins hasn't been adopted yet by private mints at the time. From 1180 until the end of the Song dynasty very few bronze coins were produced by the government as the preference went to iron, this was because bronze cash coins needed to have a specific typeface which was more intricate to produce.

A constant problem for the Song government was the outflow of its currency, particularly to the Jin dynasty which didn't produce much coinage of its own. This outflow of coins eventually caused the Song government to produce more paper money in order to sustain its economy.

By 1160 bronze coins had become a rarity, and became largely an abstract measurement of value rather than a tangible currency, the most important attribute of bronze coins after this year was as a measurement for the value of other currencies, by 1161 a shortage in wén coins had forced the Southern Song government to halve the salary of their soldiers and rather than pay them 50% in Huizi, 30% in silver, and only 20% in bronze coins. After 1170 the Song court established Huizi paper money on a permanent basis based on the "Pinda" formula that mandated that taxes were only half paid in coin and the other half in Huizi notes. This formula would prove successful as it increased the value of Huizi in circulation, while also increasing the demand for the uncommon wén coins. Huizi notes were increasingly used for commercial purposes while bronze coins were often being hoarded up as savings, although the Huizi notes were also hoarded up as savings, the government had set up a 3 year expiry term so people would have to constantly renew their banknotes at government offices to stop them from hoarding the value up like what happened with bronze coinage.

Due to the constant threat of the Mongol Empire and increased military expenditures the Song government started to cast more coins leading to inflation. Eventually coins became a rarely used item in Lin'an causing the Southern Song government to start producing small coin tallies called Qian Pai in denominations of 10, 40, 100, 200, 300, and 500 wén, in reality however the denominations were discounted per 100 wén (often at 30%) and were worth less on the actual market, an example of this would be 77 wén for official business, 75 wén for trading purposes, and could be discounted to as low as 56 for writings. The majority of Qian Pai tablets tend to have the description "(for) use in Lin'An Prefecture", the contemporary capital city. The Qian Pai are attributed to the Jingding period (1260–1264).

As the Mongols started to advance Southwards the last 3 emperors of the Song dynasty did not cast any coins as they had neither the time to set up any mints nor the resources to produce any cast coins.

List of cash coins produced by the Song dynasty 

The coins produced during the Song dynasty period include:

Northern Song dynasty cash coins

Southern Song dynasty cash coins

List of Qian Pai by inscription

Cash coins issued for Jin Army defectors 

In the year Shaoxing 1 (1131) the military forces of the Song and Jurchen Jin dynasties were encamped opposite to each other on each side of the Yangtze River, General Liu Guangshi (劉光世) created a special cash coin-like "trust token" with the inscription Zhaona Xinbao (招納信寶) which could be translated as "Treasure (coin) that recruits (Jin dynasty) soldiers who desire to return to their home" and adopted a policy that these special cash coins could be used to show that their defection from the Jin Army. The soldiers who deserted didn’t only include ethnic Han Chinese but also included Khitans and Jurchens. These additional soldiers were organised into two newly created armies named the "Read Hearts" (赤心, chì xīn) and the "Army Appearing from Nowhere" (奇兵, qí bīng). The enormous number of deserters forced the Jin general Wan Yanchang (完顏昌) to call for his remaining troops to retreat.

Contemporary coin books 

In the year 1149 the Quan Zhi (泉志) was written by Hong Zun (洪遵), which is recognised as the world's oldest extant coin book. The Quan Zhi annotated the various forms of Chinese currency from ancient China to the Song dynasty period.

Fantasy inscriptions 

While no cash coins were cast by the final three emperors of the Song dynasty with the dynastic titles, or reign era dates, of Deyou (德佑), Jingyan (景炎), and Xiangxing (祥興), both in the past and in order to meet the demand for such Southern Song dynasty era cash coins by avid coin collectors, a small number of unscrupulous ancient Chinese coin dealers manufactured fantasy Deyou and Jingyan cash coins for their own profits. 

There exists a diminutive, thin cash coin with the Xiangxing inscription, but this specific cash coin was manufactured in what is today Vietnam and is not associated with the coinage of the Southern Song dynasty (see: Vietnamese cash).

See also 

 Cash (Chinese coin)
 Chinese cash (currency unit)
 History of Chinese currency
 Jin dynasty coinage (1115–1234)
 Liao dynasty coinage
 Ming dynasty coinage
 Qing dynasty coinage
 Western Xia coinage
 Yuan dynasty coinage
 Zhou dynasty coinage

Notes

References

Sources 

 

Song dynasty
Coins of China
Cash coins
Currencies of China
Medieval currencies
Chinese numismatics